The Port of Erdemir, officially Port of Karadeniz Ereğli or shortly Er-Port is a port in the western Black Sea, located in Karadeniz Ereğli district of Zonguldak Province, Turkey, about  from the city of Zonguldak. Owned by the Turkish State Coal Mining Co., it includes commercial operations by Turkish steel-making company Erdemir, A.Ş., as well as military facilities.

Port facilities
The port consists of two older quays and two newer piers commissioned in September 1998.

The old harbour is suitable for  capacity ships with  loading quay and  coal and ore unloading quay. There are three cranes that have capacities of 1,000, 1,400 and 1,500 tons/hour on the unloading quay. On the loading quay there are four loading and unloading cranes of which one has a lifting capacity of 25 tons and the other three having a lifting capacity of 15 tons each.

Each pier has two unloading cranes with a joint capacity of 3,000 tons/hour. The unloading pier conveyor belt has a capacity of 2,500 tons/hour, and the loading /unloading pier conveyor has a capacity of 1,500 tons/hour.

References

Buildings and structures in Zonguldak Province
Ports and harbours of the Black Sea
Ports and harbours of Turkey
Transport in Zonguldak Province